Yu Haonan (born 1999) is a Chinese sport shooter.

He participated at the 2018 ISSF World Shooting Championships.

References

External links

Living people
1999 births
Chinese male sport shooters
ISSF rifle shooters
21st-century Chinese people